The Jetta VS7 is a mid-size crossover SUV manufactured by FAW-Volkswagen for its China-exclusive brand, Jetta.

Overview
The Jetta VS7 was first presented at the Auto Shanghai in April 2019, coinciding with the launch of the newly established brand of Jetta, a youth-focused brand for China named after the Volkswagen Jetta. It went on sale in China in March 2020.

Produced by FAW-Volkswagen in Chengdu, the VS7 served as the stretched three-row version of the VS5. It uses the EA211 engine, a 1.4-litre turbocharged inline four cylinder making 150 PS (148 hp) and 250 Nm (184 lb ft) of torque. The VS7 shares the same platform with the SEAT Tarraco and the Škoda Kodiaq.

Currently, the Jetta VS7 is exclusive to the market in China, with no plans for it to be sold elsewhere.

References

External links 

 Official website

Cars introduced in 2019
Crossover sport utility vehicles
Cars of China
Front-wheel-drive vehicles
2020s cars